Siddhartha Boarding Higher Secondary School, often referred to as SBHSS, is a private boarding school in Damak, Jhapa, Nepal. It was founded in 1978. The school offers education from montessori to school leaving certificate.

Academic programs 
The school provides school leaving certificate programs in the field of science and management (including hotel management). The school also provides Bachelor of Business Studies (BBS) program which ended in a couple of years.

Key persons 
 Tej Kumar Shrestha, Chairman
 Sophiya Gurung, Director
 Pooja Dahal, Coordinator
 Rex Shrestha
 Rom Shrestha

References

External links 
 https://msiddhartha.edu.np/

Schools in Nepal
1978 establishments in Nepal